Sympistis chandleri is a species of moth in the family Noctuidae (the owlet moths).

The MONA or Hodges number for Sympistis chandleri is 10140.

References

Further reading

 
 
 

chandleri
Articles created by Qbugbot
Moths described in 1873